Lock Up Your Daughters! is a 1969 British comedy film directed by Peter Coe and starring Christopher Plummer, Susannah York and Glynis Johns. It is an adaptation of the 1959 stage musical of the same name set in 18th-century Britain, which in turn is based on the 1730 comedy, Rape upon Rape, by Henry Fielding. It lacks all the songs from the original stage production. It was one of a number of British costume films released in the wake of the success of the 1963 film Tom Jones.

Plot
A bawdy yarn concerning three sex-starved sailors on leave and on the rampage in a British town.

Cast

Production
The musical ran for four years in England but never had a major production in the US. It had a run at the Pasadena Playhouse in 1967.

Christopher Plummer agreed to star, in what would be his first musical since The Sound of Music. Filming started in Ireland in March 1968.

Reception
In his review in The New York Times, Roger Greenspun wrote: "...a three-strand plot that has been so smothered in atmosphere, activity and authenticity that even the great traditions of theatrical untruth cannot breathe life into it. The production values of "Lock Up Your Daughters!" are ambitious enough to fill three movies, but they are not sufficient to substitute for one."

References

Bibliography
 Murphy, Robert. Sixties British Cinema. British Film Institute, 1992.

External links

Lock Up Your Daughters at Letterbox DVD
Lock Up Your Daughters at BFI
Lock Up Your Daughters at TCMDB

1969 films
British historical comedy films
British films based on plays
Films based on works by Henry Fielding
1960s historical comedy films
Films set in England
Films set in the 18th century
Columbia Pictures films
Films scored by Ron Grainer
1960s English-language films
1960s British films